Picnic is a 1955 American Technicolor romantic comedy-drama film filmed in Cinemascope. It was adapted for the screen by Daniel Taradash from William Inge's 1953 Pulitzer Prize-winning play of the same name. Joshua Logan, director of the original Broadway stage production, directed the film version, which stars William Holden, Kim Novak, and Rosalind Russell, with Susan Strasberg and Cliff Robertson in supporting roles. Picnic was nominated for six Academy Awards, including Best Picture, and won two.

The film dramatizes 24 hours in the life of a small Kansas town in the mid-20th century during the Labor Day holiday. It is the story of an outsider whose appearance disrupts and rearranges the lives of those with whom he comes into contact.

Plot
In the morning of Labor Day 1955, vagrant Hal Carter arrives by freight train in a Kansas town to visit his fraternity friend Alan Benson. While staying with kindly Helen Potts, Hal also meets Alan's girlfriend, Madge Owens, Madge's sister Millie, and their mother. Alan is happy to see the "same old Hal" and shows Hal his family's sprawling grain elevator operations. Alan promises Hal a steady job as a "wheat scooper" and invites him to attend the town's Labor Day picnic.

At the picnic, Hal divides his attention between Madge, Millie, and middle-aged schoolteacher Rosemary, who has been brought to the picnic by store owner Howard Bevens. All three women end up fighting over Hal. Alan blames Hal for the mess and says he is ashamed that he brought Hal in the first place. By now a crowd is watching, and Hal flees into the darkness.

Madge follows Hal to Alan's car and gets in with him. By the river, he tells her he was sent to reform school as a boy for stealing a motorcycle and that his whole life is a failure. They kiss. Outside Madge's house, they promise to meet after she finishes work the next evening. Hal drives back to Alan's house to return the car, but Alan has called the police and wants Hal arrested. Hal flees the house in Alan's car with the police following close behind. Hal shows up at Howard's apartment, asking to spend the night there. Howard is very understanding and now has his own worries: Rosemary has begged him to marry her. Back at the Owens house, Madge and Millie cry themselves to sleep in their shared room.

The next morning, Howard comes to the Owens house, intending to tell Rosemary he wants to wait, but at the sight of him she is overjoyed, thinking he has come to take her away. Howard wordlessly goes along with the misunderstanding. As he passes Madge on the stairs, he tells her Hal is hiding in the back seat of his car. Hal is able to slip away before the other women gleefully decorate Howard's car. While Howard and Rosemary happily drive off to the Ozarks, Hal and Madge meet by a shed behind the house. He tells her that he loves her and asks her to meet him in Tulsa, where they can marry and he can get a job at a hotel as a bellhop and elevator operator. Mrs. Owens finds them by the shed and threatens to call the police. Madge and Hal embrace and kiss. Hal runs to catch a passing freight train, crying out to Madge, "You love me! You love me!" Upstairs in their room, Millie tells Madge to "do something bright" for once in her life and go to Hal. Madge packs a small suitcase and, despite her mother's tears, boards a bus for Tulsa.

Cast
 William Holden as Hal Carter
 Kim Novak as Marjorie 'Madge' Owens
 Rosalind Russell as Rosemary Sydney
 Betty Field as Flo Owens
 Susan Strasberg as Millie Owens
 Cliff Robertson as Alan Benson
 Arthur O'Connell as Howard Bevans
 Verna Felton as Helen Potts
 Reta Shaw as Irma Kronkite
 Raymond Bailey as Mr. Benson
 Nick Adams as Bomber

Production
Columbia acquired the rights to the play for $350,000 in September 1953. 

Harry Cohn offered the job of directing to Joshua Logan, who had directed the stage version. Logan was grateful has he had just had a manic breakdown. He says Cohn suggested Logan cast Kim Novak but did not insist on it; the director felt Novak was very close to the character she played. Janice Rule, who played the part on Broadway, did a screen test but Logan said it went poorly. Writer Daniel Taradash pushed for Carroll Baker and who tested but Logan felt she was too young. Novak screen tested twice and was given the part. William Holden was already cast when Logan came on board. Kim Stanley played the youngster sister on stage but Logan thought she was too old on film and cast Susan Strasberg. Eileen Heckert played the school teacher on Broadway but Harry Cohn wanted a bigger name so Rosalind Russell was cast. Paul Newman was under contract to Warner Bros and was unable to reprise his role as Alan so Logan cast Cliff Robertson who had been in a touring company of Mister Roberts.

When Picnic was cast, William Holden was already 37—too old according to some to play the role of Hal Carter. Regardless, Holden was "happy to finish his Columbia Pictures contract with such a prestigious project" despite the film paying him $30,000 instead of the $250,000 he would have otherwise earned. Picnic was one of Kim Novak's early film roles, and this movie made her a star. In the film, Holden keeps his hair combed in an untidy fringe over his forehead and has the sleeves of his shirt rolled up throughout. He shaved his chest for the shirtless shots and was reportedly nervous about his dancing for the "Moonglow" scene. Logan took him to Kansas roadhouses where he practiced steps in front of jukeboxes with choreographer Miriam Nelson. Heavy thunderstorms with tornado warnings repeatedly interrupted shooting of the scene on location, and it was completed on a backlot in Burbank, where Holden (according to some sources) was "dead drunk" to calm his nerves.

Millie, the independently minded girl who memorizes Shakespeare sonnets and rebels against her older sister, was an early role for Susan Strasberg, the daughter of prominent Method drama teacher Lee Strasberg. Elizabeth Wilson had a bit part as one of the smirking schoolteachers. Verna Felton, a longtime radio and TV character actor who was well-known to audiences in the 1950s, had a strong supporting role as neighbor Helen Potts. Bomber, the paperboy, was played by Nick Adams, an actor who dated Natalie Wood and was a friend of both James Dean and Elvis Presley. Mr. Benson was played by Raymond Bailey (without his toupee), later known on television as Beverly Hillbillies banker Milburn Drysdale. Reta Shaw, Elizabeth Wilson, and Arthur O'Connell recreated their roles from the original Broadway production. This was Rosalind Russell's first Hollywood movie after a big success on Broadway with her Tony Award-winning performance in Wonderful Town (1953).

During filming of the actual picnic scenes in Halstead, Kansas, a tornado swept through the area, forcing the cast and crew to take cover. While the storm spared the set, it devastated the nearby town of Udall, Kansas, and the film crew drove their trucks and equipment there to help clean up the damage.

Locations
The extensive use of Kansas locations highlighted the naturalistic, small-town drama. Picnic was shot mostly around Hutchinson, Kansas.  Other Kansas locations include:
 Halstead's Riverside Park is where the Labor Day picnic scenes were filmed. The park and many landmarks remained at the time of the movie's 50th anniversary. The merry-go-round and cable suspension footbridge, which spans the Little Arkansas River, are still located there.
 Nickerson is the location of the two adjacent houses used for the Owens family home and that of Mrs. Potts.  It is where Hal (William Holden) "jumps a freight" to go to Tulsa and where Madge boards a bus in the last scene.
 Salina, for the opening scene where Hal jumps off a train, then meets Alan (Cliff Robertson) at Alan's father's large house. This location is also used for the Saline River (where Madge kisses Hal) and the scene where Hal escapes from the police by running under a waterfall.
 Sterling, where the pre-picnic swim in the lake was filmed.

Reception
The film's release was accompanied by a Time magazine cover story.

It earned theatrical rentals of $6,300,000 in the United States and Canada and $9 million worldwide.

The film was restored in the mid-1990s and brought many art-house bookings. Stephen Holden, in a 1996 review of the restored film, began by noting:
Today it probably wouldn't be worth more than a PG-13 rating (if even that), but in 1955, the "Moonglow" dance and the "torn shirt" sequences from the movie Picnic were about as steamy as Hollywood could get in evoking explosive sex.
According to Holden, "Rosalind Russell is vividly scary as an older schoolteacher who foolishly lunges after Hal. Betty Field is just right as Madge's wistful, once-beautiful mother, who years earlier ran away with a man like Hal, and Susan Strasberg does well in the role of Madge's tomboyish younger sister. George Duning's wistful, Copland-influenced score captures the mood of heated yearning that not only engulfed the movie, but also defined the country's romantic ethos in the mid-'50s."

Awards and honors

The film is recognized by American Film Institute in these lists:
 2002: AFI's 100 Years ... 100 Passions – number 59
 2005: AFI's 100 Years of Film Scores – nominated

Music
"Theme from Picnic" was a hit song which reached number one on the 1956 Billboard charts and was number 14 overall that year. Composed by George Duning and Steve Allen (although Allen's lyrics were not used in the film), the song is featured in the famous dance scene between Holden and Novak, wherein Columbia's musical director Morris Stoloff blended "Theme from Picnic" with the 1930s standard "Moonglow". The two songs often were paired in later recordings by other artists. The soundtrack album reached number 23 on the Billboard charts. The Theme from Picnic was also a popular song recorded by the McGuire Sisters, and was a top 10 hit in 1956.

Subliminal marketing hoax
In 1957, marketing researcher James Vicary said he had included subliminal messages such as "eat popcorn" and "drink Coca-Cola" in public screenings of Picnic for six weeks, claiming sales of Coca-Cola and popcorn increased 18.1% and 57.8% respectively. However, after being unable to replicate the results, Vicary later admitted that he had falsified the data.

Remakes
Picnic was remade for television twice. The first was in 1986, directed by Marshall W. Mason and starring Gregory Harrison, Jennifer Jason Leigh, Michael Learned, Rue McClanahan, and Dick Van Patten. The second remake was in 2000, starring Josh Brolin, Gretchen Mol, Bonnie Bedelia, Jay O. Sanders, and Mary Steenburgen. The screenplay adaptation by Shelley Evans was directed by Ivan Passer.

See also

List of American films of 1955

References

External links

 
 
 
 
 
 
 

1955 films
1955 comedy films
1955 drama films
1950s romantic comedy-drama films
American films based on plays
American romantic comedy-drama films
Columbia Pictures films
Films about social class
Films directed by Joshua Logan
Films scored by George Duning
Films set in Kansas
Films shot in Kansas
Films whose art director won the Best Art Direction Academy Award
Films whose director won the Best Director Golden Globe
Films whose editor won the Best Film Editing Academy Award
Salina, Kansas
CinemaScope films
Films set in 1955
Picnic films
1950s English-language films
1950s American films